Loud Lucy was an American alternative rock band, part of the Chicago indie-rock scene of the early-to-mid-1990s.

Described by the Chicago-Tribune as "scrappy, unpretentious pop rock," Loud Lucy's single, Ticking, reached number 38 on Billboard's Mainstream Rock Songs chart.

The band dissolved a few years after their debut album Breathe. The lead singer, Christian Lane, has had success as an actor and musician in TV and film.

References

Indie rock musical groups from Illinois
Musical groups established in 1992
Musical groups disestablished in 1998